is a town located in Yamagata Prefecture, Japan. , the town had an estimated population of 7,562, and a population density of 230 persons per km².

Mikawa is the seat of the prefectural government's "general branch office" Shōnai that is responsible for the Shōnai Region. It is also the seat of the central government's MLIT transportation branch office that licenses the Shōnai vehicle registration plate for the Shōnai Region.

Geography
Mikawa is located in the coastal plains of northeast Yamagata Prefecture in the Shōnai Region (which also contains neighbouring Shōnai Town).  It is a very flat region divided by large rivers and vast fields of rice.

Neighboring municipalities
Yamagata Prefecture
Tsuruoka
Sakata
Shōnai

Climate
Mikawa has a Humid continental climate (Köppen climate classification Cfa) with large seasonal temperature differences, with warm to hot (and often humid) summers and cold (sometimes severely cold) winters. Precipitation is significant throughout the year, but is heaviest from August to October.

Demographics
Per Japanese census data, the population of Mikawa has declined gradually over the past 70 years.

History
The area of present-day Mikawa was part of ancient Dewa Province. After the start of the Meiji period, the area became part of Higashitagawa District, Yamagata Prefecture. The villages of Yokoyama and Oshikiri and the village of Togō Village in Nishitagawa District were established with the creation of the modern municipalities system on April 1, 1889. The three villages merged to form the village of Mikawa on January 1, 1955. Mikawa was elevated to town status on June 1, 1968.

Economy
The economy of Mikawa is based on agriculture.

Education
Mikawa has three public elementary schools and one public middle school operated by the town government. The town does not have a high school.

Transportation

Railway
Mikawa does not have any passenger railway service.

Highway

International relations

Twin towns — Sister cities
 - Aga, Niigata, Japan
 - McMinnville, Tennessee, USA

Noted people from Mikawa
Hikaru Okuizumi – author
Kōsō Abe – Imperial Japanese Navy admiral

References

External links

Official Website} 

 
Towns in Yamagata Prefecture